Carrie Fisher was an American actress and writer. During her almost five-decade-long career, she had appearances in over 50 films, as well as various television series, documentaries, late night talk shows, video games, and commercials. Her credits also include writing novels, screenplays, and television specials and series episodes.

In 1959, Fisher was cast as a "little girl" in the documentary A Visit with Debbie Reynolds. She was cast as "girl scout" in Debbie Reynolds and the Sound of Children (1969) and as Lorna Karpf in Shampoo (1975). Fisher's breakout role was Princess Leia Organa in 1977's Star Wars alongside Mark Hamill (as Luke Skywalker) and Harrison Ford (as Han Solo). The Star Wars franchise garnered Fisher with five film award nominations with one turning into a win in 2018—Choice Fantasy Actress for Star Wars: The Last Jedi.

Fisher wrote a semi-autobiographical novel, Postcards from the Edge  (1987), which was later adapted for film with the same name (1990). She also wrote the book Wishful Drinking (2008) and a memoir The Princess Diarist (2016), among other books, screenplays, and plays.

Film

Television

Video games

See also 
 Carrie Fisher awards and nominations

References

External links 

 
 
 
 "Working the Edge", a 1990 Entertainment Weekly cover story profiling Fisher
 Carrie Fisher—acting credits at Aveleyman.com

Actress filmographies
American filmographies